Meher Aur Meherban is a 2016 Pakistani drama television series aired on Urdu 1, produced by Wajahat Rauf and Shazia Wajahat under their production banner "Showcase Productions".

Cast
Waseem Abbas
Shagufta Ejaz as Ayesha
Sanam Chaudhry as Muzna
Sonia Mishal as Unaiza
Affan Waheed as Shahzeb
Ali Abbas
Laila Zuberi
Qasim Khan
Hashim Butt
Imran Patel
Fahad Ahmed

References

External links
 Official Website

Urdu-language television shows
Pakistani drama television series
2016 Pakistani television series debuts
Urdu 1 original programming